The 2001–02 Arkansas Razorbacks men's basketball team represented the University of Arkansas in the 2001–02 college basketball season. The head coach was Nolan Richardson, serving for his 17th year. However, with two games remaining in the regular season, Richardson was fired after making some challenging remarks towards Arkansas long-time athletic director Frank Broyles. Assistant head coach Mike Anderson became the interim head coach for the remainder of the season. The team played its home games in Bud Walton Arena in Fayetteville, Arkansas.

Schedule

|-
!colspan=9| 2002 SEC men's basketball tournament

Source:

References

Arkansas
Arkansas Razorbacks men's basketball seasons
Razor
Razor